Saksang or sa-sang is a savory, spicy Indonesian dish from the  Batak people. It is made from minced pork or dog meat (or, more rarely, water buffalo meat) stewed in its blood, coconut milk and spices; including kaffir lime and bay leaves, coriander, shallot, garlic, chili pepper and Thai pepper, lemongrass, ginger, galangal, turmeric and andaliman (the fruit of a native shrub similar to Sichuan pepper).

Although saksang is widely consumed and familiar within Batak tribes' traditions, it is more often associated with Batak Toba. Saksang has special significance to the Bataks, as it is an obligatory dish in Batak marriage celebrations. Saksang, together with panggang, arsik and daun ubi tumbuk, are the essential dishes in Batak cuisine.

See also

Beutelwurst
Blood soup
Dinuguan
 List of stews
Svartsoppa
Sarapatel

References

Batak cuisine
Indonesian stews
Blood dishes